The Devil is a surviving 1915 silent film version of the Ferenc Molnár play, adapted by Thomas Ince. It was directed by Ince and Reginald Barker and stars Bessie Barriscale and Edward Connelly.

Plot
The Devil, in the guise of a human, meets a young couple who remark upon looking at a Renaissance painting of a martyr that Evil could never triumph over Good. The Devil, taking this as a challenge, decides to bring about the couple's downfall.

Cast
 Bessie Barriscale 
 Edward Connelly
 Arthur Maude
 Clara Williams
 Rhea Mitchell
 J. Barney Sherry
 Arthur Hollingsworth

References

External links

1915 films
Silent American drama films
American silent feature films
1915 drama films
American black-and-white films
Films directed by Reginald Barker
1910s American films